Erubey Cabuto García (born 6 September 1975) is a Mexican former professional football goalkeeper. He won one cap for the Mexico national team and was a member of the Mexican squad at the 2001 FIFA Confederations Cup.

Career
Born in Tepic, Cabuto began playing professional football with F.C. Atlas. He made his Primera debut against Santos Laguna on 23 December 1995.

Cabuto joined Querétaro F.C. in 2002. He also had a stint with Chiapas before finishing his playing career with Querétaro in 2007.

References

External links

 
 
 

1975 births
Living people
Footballers from Nayarit
People from Tepic
Association football goalkeepers
Mexican footballers
Mexico international footballers
2001 FIFA Confederations Cup players
Atlas F.C. footballers
Querétaro F.C. footballers
Chiapas F.C. footballers